Osborne Colson (March 31, 1916 – July 14, 2006) was a Canadian figure skater and coach.

Colson was born in Toronto, Ontario on March 31, 1916.  His father was one of the founders of the Toronto Cricket, Skating and Curling Club.  He won the Canadian Figure Skating Championships in 1936 and 1937.  He trained with Gus Lussi during his competitive career.  He later skated professionally with Ice Follies.

As a coach, he worked with skaters including Barbara Ann Scott, Donald Jackson, Patrick Chan and Sarah Kawahara.  He continued to stay active in the sport late in life as the coach of Patrick Chan, who won the 2005 Canadian junior championship under his guidance.

Colson died in Toronto on July 14, 2006, from pneumonia and other complications from a car accident earlier in the year.

Results
men's singles

 J = Junior level

Pairs with Mary Jane Halsted

References
 
 Obituary from The Globe and Mail, July 20, 2006.

External links
 OSBORNE COLSON, SKATING COACH 1916-2006 at The Globe and Mail 
 Osborne Colson Memorial Page

Navigation

Canadian male single skaters
Canadian figure skating coaches
1916 births
2006 deaths
Figure skaters from Toronto
Road incident deaths in Canada